The rhythmic gymnastics competition of the 2006 Central American and Caribbean Games was held in Cartagena, Colombia from 15–30 July 2006.



Medal summary

Medal table

See also 
 Artistic gymnastics at the 2006 Central American and Caribbean Games

References

  

 2006 Central American and Caribbean Games